In the Night is the 5th full-length album by the Swedish heavy metal band Dream Evil.

Track listing

Credits
Nick Night (aka Niklas Isfeldt) - Vocals
Dannee Demon (aka Daniel Varghamne) - Lead Guitar
Ritchie Rainbow  (aka Fredrik Nordström) - Rhythm Guitar
Pete Pain (aka Peter Stålfors) - Bass Guitar
Pat Power (aka Patrik Jerksten) - Drums

References

2010 albums
Dream Evil albums
Century Media Records albums
Albums produced by Fredrik Nordström